St  Ives is a medieval market town and civil parish in  the Huntingdonshire district in Cambridgeshire, England,  east of Huntingdon and  north-west of Cambridge. St Ives is historically in the historic county of 
Huntingdonshire.

History
The township was originally known as Slepe in Anglo Saxon England. In 1001-2, a peasant is recorded as uncovering the remains of Ivo of Ramsey, a Cornish Celtic Christian Bishop and hermit while ploughing a field. The discovery led Eadnoth the Younger, an important monk and prelate to found Ramsey Abbey. Slepe was listed in the Hundred of Hurstingstone in Huntingdonshire  in the Domesday Book.

The importance of Ramsey Abbey grew through the Middle Ages. In the order of precedence for abbots in Parliament, Ramsey was third after Glastonbury and St Alban's. Its influence benefited the area as Slepe became St Ives and was granted a charter to become a market town, hosting one of the biggest in the country. It was an important route on the Silk Road when it was known as Slepe. The market town still remains an important market on the edge of The Fens to this day.

As St Ives was founded on the banks of the wide River Great Ouse between Huntingdon and Ely, it had become an important entrepôt for trade in East Anglia. The size and prosperity of the medieval town can be still seen in its street plan. In the early 15th century, St Ives Bridge was constructed across the Great Ouse replacing an earlier crossing at this point. The six-arch stone bridge was one of only four town bridges in England to have a chapel. In the Early Medieval period, this had been a strategic location on the Great Ouse because it was the last natural crossing point or ford on the river,  from the sea. A flint reef in the riverbed created a ford; it was reused as the foundations for the stone bridge. Throughout the medieval period, it was a source of income for the town as tolls had to be paid by all those wanting to cross, this especially applied to drovers bringing their livestock to market.

From the 17th to the mid 19th century, St Ives remained a hub for trade and navigation in this part of East Anglia. There were inns and bawdy houses to cater for the merchants, mariners and drovers who did business in the town. Goods were brought into the town on barges and livestock rested on the last fattening grounds before being sent to London's Smithfield Market. However, with the arrival of Cambridge and St Ives branch line in the 1840s and improvements to the local road networks, commercial traffic on the River Great Ouse went into steady decline.

The river Great Ouse at St Ives flooded in 1947, and some parts suffered seriously again at Easter 1998 and in January 2003. Extensive flood protection works were carried out on both sides of the river in 2006-07 at a cost of nearly £9 million.  of brick-clad steel-piling was put into place to protect the town, most noticeably at the Waits, where a plaza has also been created. A further  on the other side of the river protects Hemingford Grey, reducing the yearly risk of flooding from 10% to 1%. Building on the flood plain at St Ives is now discouraged.

Original historical documents relating to St Ives, including the original parish church registers, local government records, maps and photographs, are held by Cambridgeshire Archives and Local Studies at the County Record Office in Huntingdon.

Governance

As a civil parish, St Ives has a town council, based at St Ives Town Hall, consisting of seventeen councillors including a Town Mayor and a deputy Town Mayor. The second tier of local government is Huntingdonshire District Council, a non-metropolitan district of Cambridgeshire. St Ives has three district wards for the district council; St Ives East, St Ives South, and St Ives West. St Ives East and St Ives South are both represented by two district councillors, and St Ives West is represented on the district council by one councillor. For St Ives the highest tier of local government is Cambridgeshire County Council. St Ives is part of the electoral division of St Ives  and is represented on the county council by two councillors.

St Ives was in the historic and administrative county of Huntingdonshire until 1965. From 1965, the village was part of the new administrative county of Huntingdon and Peterborough. In 1974, following the Local Government Act 1972, St Ives became a part of the county of Cambridgeshire.

At Westminster St Ives is in the parliamentary constituency of Huntingdon, and since 2001 has been represented in the House of Commons by Jonathan Djanogly (Conservative).

Geography

St Ives was the subject of town planning at a very early date, giving it a spacious town centre. Portions of the open space between Merryland and Crown Street were lost to market stalls that turned into permanent buildings. Some of the shops in the town centre are still in the same layout as in medieval times, one rod in width, the standard length for floor and roof joists. The lanes along the north side of town are believed to follow the layout of the narrow medieval fields, and are slightly S-shaped because of the way ploughs turned at each end. Similar field boundaries can be seen in Warners Park.

Demography

Population
In the period 1801 to 1901 the population of St Ives was recorded every ten years by the UK census.  During this time the population was in the range of 2,099 (the lowest was in 1801) and 3,572 (the highest was in 1851).

From 1901, a census was taken every ten years with the exception of 1941 (due to the Second World War).

All population census figures from report Historic Census figures Cambridgeshire to 2011 by Cambridgeshire Insight.

Economy
The Monday market takes over the town centre, and is larger in scale on Bank Holidays in May and August. There is a Friday market, and a Farmers' Market on the first and third Saturday every month. The Michaelmas Fair takes over for three days from the second Monday in October, and there is a carnival which is the biggest public gathering in Huntingdonshire. The town has a mixture of shops, bars, coffee lounges, a department store and other amenities.

Public houses

As an important market town, St Ives always needed large numbers of public houses, many of which were bawdy houses: 64 in 1838 (1 for every 55 inhabitants), 60 in 1861, 48 in 1865 and 45 in 1899, although only five of these made the owners a living. As livestock sales diminished, however, so did the need for large numbers of pubs, falling to a low point of 16 in 1962. In that year the Seven Wives on Ramsey Road was opened and, with some openings and closings since, there are 17 today. The oldest name is the Dolphin; in use on the same site for over 300 years, its current usage is for a hotel built in 1985. Next oldest is the White Hart, which is pre-1720. Nelson's Head and Golden Lion are at least as old but have not kept the same name: they used to be called the Three Tuns and the Red Lion respectively. There has been a pub on the site of the Robin Hood from a similar date; in fact it was originally two separate pubs: the Angel and the Swan. The claim of the Royal Oak to date from 1502 cannot be proven since, while a portion at the back is 17th-century (making it physically the oldest portion of any pub in St Ives), the pub name is more recent. The reference is to Charles II's famous escape from Cromwell's Roundheads, and Charles was restored to the throne in 1660.

The Golden Lion was a 19th-century coaching inn. The Official Guide to the Great Eastern Railway referred to it in 1893 as one of two "leading hotels" in St Ives and there are a number of ghost stories associated with the pub.

Landmarks

St Ives Bridge

St Ives Bridge is most unusual in incorporating a chapel, the most striking of only four examples in England. Also unusual are its two southern arches which are a different shape from the rest of the bridge, being rounded instead of slightly gothic. After the dissolution of the monasteries in 1537, the chapel was given to the prior to live in. The lords of the manor of St Ives changed hands several times, as did the chapel. During this period, it was in turn - a private house, a doctors surgery and a pub, called Little Hell. The pub had a reputation for rowdy behaviour, and it is believed the landlord kept pigs in the basement. The additional two storeys added in the seventeenth century were removed in 1930, due to damage being caused to the foundations. 
The chapel features colourfully in the historical novel 'Not Just a Whore', by local St Ives resident K M Warwick, where it is described as a fictitious "Bawdy House" (brothel). The bridge was partially rebuilt after Oliver Cromwell knocked down two arches during the English Civil War to prevent King Charles I's troops approaching London from the Royalist base in Lincolnshire. During the war and for some period afterwards, the gap was covered by a drawbridge. The town square contains a statue of Oliver Cromwell erected in 1901. It is one of four statues of Cromwell on public display in Britain, the others being in Parliament Square, outside Wythenshawe Hall and in Warrington.

Holt Island
The eastern or town end of Holt Island is nature reserve, and the western end, opposite the parish church, is a facility for the Sea Scouts. The scout portion contains what was, before the opening of the Leisure Centre, the town's outdoor town swimming pool. The pool was dug in 1913 and closed to the public in 1949. It is now used by the scouts for canoeing and rappelling. In November 1995, the island was the locus of a significant lawsuit and a break-away Scouting Association was prevented from using and developing a claim to it.

Culture
The Norris Museum was founded by Herbert Norris, who left his lifetime's collection of Huntingdonshire relics to the people of St Ives when he died in 1931. The Norris Museum holds a collection on local history, including a number of books written by its former curator, Bob Burn-Murdoch. 
The museum was reopened in August 2017, following a £1.5m refurbishment and expansion made possible by a Heritage Lottery Fund grant. Since 2020 its director has been Claire Hardy, and it is managed by the Norris Management Trust Group, made up of members of St Ives Town Council and the Friends of the Norris Museum.

The Corn Exchange is a Grade II listed building, first opened in 1864, built and paid for by local businessmen. Local corn merchants used the building, but it was also used for concerts and meetings. The building was sold to the then St Ives Borough Council in 1947 and passed to the Town Council following Local Government Reorganisation in 1974. Structural concerns led to the building being closed in 2001 and subsequent years saw a number of schemes for refurbishment being put forward, but none was taken forward. In 2006, when it appeared likely that the building would be sold off, a campaign group, Action Corn Exchange (ACE), was created by local residents to save the building and retain it for community use. Although a ‘For Sale’ sign did appear briefly on the building, in late 2007 the Town Council decided to restore the building and fund the work. Renovation work started in late 2009 and the restored building was formally re-opened on 24 June 2010. St Ives Corn Exchange is the home of the St Ives Youth Theatre which formed in 2001.

Each year the town hosts a free 2-day carnival and music festival which was launched in 1999, as part of the committee set up for the millennium.

Sport

There are 2 leisure facilities, the indoor centre is adjacent to the Burgess conference and Events Hall and an outdoor centre in the west of the town. The original swimming pool, fed by the river, is in the middle of Holt Island and is now used for canoeing practice and other activities. St Ives also has a Rugby club on Somersham Road, and a non-league football club, St Ives Town F.C., which plays at Westwood Road.  St Ives Rowing Club was formed in 1865, was once captained by John Goldie and has had a number of members who have competed at Olympic and Commonwealth championships. There is a swimming club and an 18 hole championship golf course.

Education
St Ives has a main secondary school, St Ivo Academy and four primary schools: Eastfield, Thorndown, Westfield and Wheatfields.

Transport

Guided busway

The major section of the world's longest guided busway, using all new construction techniques and technology, connects St Ives directly to Cambridge Science Park on the outskirts of Cambridge along the route of a disused railway line. The same buses continue into the centre of Cambridge along regular roads in one direction and continue to Huntingdon in the other direction. A shorter section of the same busway system operates from the railway station on the far side of Cambridge to Addenbrooke's Hospital and Trumpington. The scheme, budgeted at £116.2 million, opened in summer 2011. Construction of the busway was beset with problems, causing delays; for example, cracks appeared in the structure allowing weeds to grow through. Contractors BAM Nuttall were fined a significant amount of money for each day that the busway completion date was not met.

The St Ives Park & Ride on Meadow Lane is part of the scheme and will open at the same time. A "Green Update" newsletter came out in Winter 2007 with news on conservation work including protection of the Great Crested Newt.

Road
St Ives is just off the A1307 (former A14) road on what was a particularly congested section of the route from the UK's second city, Birmingham, to the port of Felixstowe and thence to the mainland of Europe Before the opening of the new bypass, this  section of road also linked the northern end of the M11 (Cambridge and region) to the A1 and the whole of the North of England and Scotland. The new A14 bypass for St Ives and Huntingdon opened in December 2019, leaving the existing alignment near Swavesey and passing to the south of both market towns. A northern bypass has been under discussion for even longer but is not anticipated any time soon.

Rail and conventional bus
Bus services are provided by Stagecoach in Huntingdonshire and Go Whippet, the former also having its depot near the town. Services to Cambridge and Huntingdon are frequent during the day, though less frequent in the evenings.  There are also buses to Somersham, Ramsey and Cambourne.

Between 1847 and 1970 the town was served by St Ives railway station on the Cambridge and Huntingdon railway. The line from Cambridge and the station almost survived the 1963 to 1973 Beeching Axe, but were lost to passenger service in the final stages of the process. Some sections continued to be used for freight until 1993. A campaign to reopen the passenger rail service only ended with the ripping-up of disused track shortly before construction of the Guided Busway. Buses using the Busway system provide direct links to both Huntingdon and Cambridge stations.

Religious sites

There are ten places of worship, including the ancient parish church. Many other Christian denominations are also represented, and the town also has a mosque and an Islamic Community Centre.

All Saints Church (Church of England) on Church Street has been in the town since AD970 and is one of only two Grade I listed buildings in the town, the other being The Bridge. Originally the parish church of the settlement of Slepe, before St Ives came into existence, it now enjoys a tranquil location at the end of Church Street, situated to the west of the town centre. All Saints, as it stands today, dates largely from the rebuilding of the late 15th century. It was extensively reordered in the late 19th century by Sir Ninian Comper.

The church which dominates the town's market place, is The Free Church (United Reformed Church). This was built in 1864, but was modernised in 1980, moving the worship area upstairs. The Church of the Sacred Heart (Roman Catholic) on Needingworth Road, was originally built by Augustus Pugin in Cambridge, but was dismantled in 1902 and transported by barge to St Ives. The hall at the back was added in about 2001. The current Methodist Church on The Waits opened in 1905. Crossways Church (Assembly of God) meet at Crossways Christian Centre on Ramsey Road. St Ives Christian Fellowship (Partnership) meet at Thorndown Junior School on Hill Rise. The Bridge Church (New Frontiers) meet in a newly renovated former industrial building on the corner of Burrel Road and Marley Road. St Ives Evangelical Christian Church (Evangelical) meet at the Burleigh Hill Community Centre, off Constable Road.

Cultural references
 
The town name is featured in the anonymous nursery rhyme/riddle "As I was going to St Ives". While sometimes claimed to be St Ives, Cornwall, the man with seven wives, each with seven sacks containing seven cats etc. may have been on his way to (or coming from) the Great Fair at St Ives. On Ramsey Road there is a public house called The Seven Wives, though this is a modern pub with no connection to the ancient rhyme other than the name.

The term tawdry is a St Ives-derived word (vying with the rival Ely claim), basically meaning something that is 'cheap and cheerful', and was evolved directly from the Saint Audrey's Lane cloth market held during the mediaeval and later ages.  Made from discarded inferior wool and/or other felt fibres, it was a popular source of cheap material bought by the locals, and those further afield, who flocked to the market in their droves to buy cheap supplies for their own domestic clothing.

The famous war poet Rupert Brooke lived for a time at Grantchester. In his famous poem "The Old Vicarage, Grantchester" he heaped praise on his own village, but not on the shire town of Cambridge itself, or on the other villages around. Of St Ives he wrote:

Notable residents
Scott Barron, ex-Brentford footballer
Dominic Byrne, The Chris Moyles Show, BBC Radio 1
Paul Clammer, author of Lonely Planet guide to Afghanistan
Leanne Jones, actress, grew up in St Ives
Bryony Kimmings, performance artist, screenwriter
John Ruddy, Birmingham City goalkeeper
Dave Mackintosh, Professional musician; ex- Dragonforce drummer and Bal-Sagoth drummer.
Joe Bugner, Heavyweight boxer who lived in the town after leaving Hungary he challenged for the world heavyweight titles against Muhammad Ali

References

Further reading
St Ives, Slepe by the Ouse, by Noel Hudson. Black Bear Press, 1989,

External links

 St Ives Town Council web-site

 
Market towns in Cambridgeshire
Huntingdonshire
Populated places on the River Great Ouse
Civil parishes in Cambridgeshire
Towns in Cambridgeshire